Placosaris triticalis is a species of moth of the family Crambidae described by George Hamilton Kenrick in 1907. It is found in Papua New Guinea.

This species has a wingspan of 26 mm.

References

External links
Images at Boldsystems.org

Spilomelinae